Naqdi-ye Sofla (also Romanized as Nāqdī-ye Soflā; also known as Naghdi Sofla, Naqdī-ye Pā’īn, Noqdeh-ye Ashāqī, Noqdī-ye Pā’īn, and Nugdi) is a village in Naqdi Rural District, Meshgin-e Sharqi District, Meshgin Shahr County, Ardabil Province, Iran. At the 2006 census, its population was 166, in 38 families.

References 

Towns and villages in Meshgin Shahr County